Langenscheidt is a German publishing company that specializes in language reference works. In addition to publishing monolingual dictionaries, Langenscheidt also publishes bilingual dictionaries and travel phrase-books.

Langenscheidt has language-to-language dictionaries in many languages, including: English, French, Spanish, Italian, Dutch, Swedish, Greek, Ancient Greek, Latin, Arabic, Chinese and Croatian, and in varying sizes, ranging from small travel pocket dictionaries to large desk sized ones.

History 
The Langenscheidt Publishing Group was founded on 1 October 1856 by Gustav Langenscheidt, in response to other publishers' refusal to publish his self-study materials for learning French, which he subsequently published under the title „ Unterrichtsbriefe zur Erlernung der französischen Sprache“ ("Teaching letters for learning the French language"). These learning materials became very popular and were widely read so much  so that even today, Langenscheidt can be considered the "Father of distance education". From 1867, Langenscheidt Publishing Group had its own printing press.

From 1869 Langenscheidt worked with Karl Sachs and Césaire Villatte on the Encyklopädisches französisch-deutsches und deutsch-französisches Wörterbuch ("Encyclopedic French-German and German-French dictionary") and published it in 1880.  In 1874, Langenscheidt  was awarded the title of professor.

In 1891, in close collaboration with Eduard Muret and Daniel Sanders, he started working on the English equivalent, the Encyklopädisches englisch-deutsches und deutsch-englisches Wörterbuch ("Encyclopedic English-German and German-English dictionary"). Langenscheidt did not live to see its publication; his son Carl, his successor, published it in 1901.

In 2019, Langenscheidt was acquired by Klett, owner of the competing dictionary Pons.

Dictionary structure 

The structure for most Langenscheidt dictionaries is the same.  Most pocket dictionaries include around 55,000 references designed for tourists or people studying beginning or intermediate foreign languages, while larger desk sized interlanguage dictionaries include around 220,000 references.  After the two languages' references conclude, grammatical assistance appears in the Appendix section, including helpful abbreviations, geographical regions, currency values, temperature conversions, and numerical values.

See also 
 Verlag Enzyklopädie

References

External links 
Official Site (in English)
German Site (in German, focus is on dictionaries)

Book publishing companies of Germany
Dictionaries
Publishing companies established in 1856
Reference publishers